Hull to York Line was a historical rail service that took different routes at different times.

Pre-1965 : A train service over the Hull to Scarborough Line as far as Beverley, then over the York to Beverley Line (service ended 1960s with closure of second line)
Post-1965 : A train service over the Hull to Selby Line, then over part of the  Leeds and Selby Line with a junction to York at either:
York junction, onto the former York and North Midland Railway, and via Sherburn-in-Elmet station
Post-1983 : Hambleton junction, then via the Selby Diversion of the East Coast Main Line

See also
TransPennine Express

External links

Rail transport in the East Riding of Yorkshire
Rail transport in North Yorkshire
Rail transport in York
Rail transport in Kingston upon Hull
Railway lines in Yorkshire and the Humber